Chaoyangchuan is a town in Yanji, Yanbian, Jilin, China. It has a total population of 54,000 and an area of 393 sq km. 65% of the population is Korean. Chaoyangchuan is divided into the following divisions: Shengli Community, Wenhua Community, Chunguang Community, Chaoyang Community, Heping Community, Jicheng Village, Qinlao Village, Taidong Village, Guangshi Village, Dexin Village, Hexing Village, Sanfeng Village, Sancheng Village, Dongfeng Village, Changqing Village, Guangrong Village , Chaoyang Village, Longsheng Village, Liuxin Village, Hengdao Village, Zhongping Village, Taixing Village, Badao Village, Changsheng Village and Hepingdao Village.

References 

Yanji
Township-level divisions of Jilin